Membrey is a surname. Notable people with the surname include:

 James Membrey (1862–1940), Australian politician
 Jordan Membrey (born 1996), Australian rules footballer
 Tim Membrey (born 1994), Australian rules footballer

See also
 Membrey, commune in the Haute-Saône department in the region of Bourgogne-Franche-Comté in eastern France